The Central European Basketball League, or CEBL for short, was a basketball tournament with Central European basketball teams.

In the 2008/2009 inaugural season, teams from the following five countries participated: Czech Republic, Austria, Romania, Hungary and Slovakia.

After the group rounds, Final Four was held in Timișoara, Romania. In the final match, Albacomp Fehervar won against BCM Elba Timișoara.

Teams

Regular season

Group A

Group B

Group C

Final Four

References

2008–09 in European basketball leagues
Basketball in Europe